Poverty in North Korea is extensive, though reliable statistics are hard to come by due to lack of reliable research, pervasive censorship and extensive media manipulation in North Korea.

Poverty in North Korea has been widely repeated by Western media sources  with the majority referring to the famine that affected the country in the mid-1990s. A 2006 report suggests that North Korea requires an estimated 5.3m tonnes of grain per year while harvesting only an estimated 4.5m tonnes, and thus relies on foreign aid to overcome the deficit.Starvation continues to be a systemic problem. In 2021, there were reports of widespread starvation in North Korea.

North Korea has a command economy, which is common among communist nations. The government has complete control over all monetary exchanges, causing the economy to remain stagnant due to a lack of competition between businesses. Poverty in North Korea has also been attributed to poor governance by the totalitarian regime. It is estimated that 60% of the total population of North Korea live below the poverty line in 2020.

See also

Media coverage of North Korea
Jangmadang
Economy of North Korea#Crisis and famine

References

Further reading